Thunder Road is a short comedy-drama film written, directed by, and starring Jim Cummings. Shot in one take, the film depicts a police officer giving a eulogy for his mother. It premiered at the 2016 Sundance Film Festival, where it received positive reviews, winning the Short Film Grand Jury Prize. A feature-length adaptation of the same name was released in 2018, also written, directed by, and starring Cummings.

Synopsis 
Police officer Arnaud eulogizes his mother at her funeral by singing and dancing to the Bruce Springsteen song, "Thunder Road".

Production 
Cummings wrote the film over 2 months on his commutes to work at CollegeHumor. He sold his wedding rings to help fund it.

Reception 
On review aggregator Rotten Tomatoes, the film holds an approval rating of 100% based on 8 reviews, with an average rating of 7.3/10. Metacritic gives the film a weighted average score of 81 out of 100, based on 4 critics, indicating "universal acclaim".

The film was awarded at the Sundance Film Festival with the Short Film Grand Jury Prize, being called "a mini masterpiece of writing, directing and acting". Short of the Week called it "funny, inventive, and thought-provoking" and "the toast of this year’s American festival circuit-", and IndieWire listed it as one of the best short films ever made.

Awards and nominations

References

External links 

 
 

2016 comedy-drama films
2016 films
2016 short films
One-shot films
Films directed by Jim Cummings (filmmaker)
Sundance Film Festival award winners
2010s English-language films